Andrés Gómez and Ivan Lendl were the defending champions, but lost in the semifinals to Guy Forget and Anders Järryd.

Forget and Jarryd won the title by defeating Boris Becker and Slobodan Živojinović 7–5, 4–6, 7–5 in the final.

Seeds

Draw

Draw

References

External links
 Official results archive (ATP)
 Official results archive (ITF)

Wembley Championships
1985 Grand Prix (tennis)